The Chicopee Valley Aqueduct carries water from the Quabbin Reservoir in Massachusetts to the Chicopee city line. It delivers Quabbin water to Wilbraham, South Hadley fire district #1, and Chicopee. It is part of the Chicopee River Watershed.

History
In 1947, the Massachusetts Legislature authorized the construction of the aqueduct, which was completed three years later.

Present day
The Massachusetts Water Resources Authority initiated the Chicopee Valley Aqueduct Pipeline Redundancy project to provide redundancy and to improve reliability to the Chicopee Valley Aqueduct water transmission system to the three already served communities. The design phase was completed in 2001.  Construction of a redundant barrel was substantially completed in 2008.

Notes

References
Massachusetts Water Resources Authority, Water System History, accessed on 2006-10-08
 https://web.archive.org/web/20060728225354/http://www.nae.usace.army.mil/news/2005-10.htm, accessed on 2006-10-08

Buildings and structures in Chicopee, Massachusetts
Aqueducts in Massachusetts
Transportation buildings and structures in Hampden County, Massachusetts
1950 establishments in Massachusetts
Infrastructure completed in 1950